Waltz Op. 69, No. 2 was composed by Frédéric Chopin for solo piano in the year 1829 at the age of 19. Although it was published posthumously in 1855 by his friend Julian Fontana, together with the Waltz Op. 69, No. 1. The main theme is in the key of B minor and is marked with an overall tempo of Moderato.

The piece is largely melancholic with three different sections and melodies which changes to B major and again reverts to the original theme. It is one of several works that the composer hoped would be burnt upon his death.

References

Waltzes by Frédéric Chopin
1829 compositions
Compositions in B minor
Compositions by Frédéric Chopin published posthumously
Music with dedications